Rod Cameron may refer to:

Rod Cameron (actor) (1910–1983), Canadian actor
Rod Cameron (footballer) (born 1939), English footballer
Roderick Cameron (1825–1900), Canadian-American businessman